Glasgow City Council is the local government authority for the city of Glasgow, Scotland. In its modern form it was created in 1996. Glasgow was formerly governed by a corporation, also known as the town council, from the granting of its first burgh charter in the 1170s until 1975. From 1975 until 1996 the city was governed by City of Glasgow District Council, a lower-tier authority within the Strathclyde region.

Glasgow City Council has been under no overall control since 2017, being led by a Scottish National Party minority administration. The council has its headquarters at Glasgow City Chambers in George Square, completed in 1889.

History

Glasgow Corporation
Glasgow was given its first burgh charter sometime between 1175 and 1178 by William the Lion. It was then run by "Glasgow Town Council", also known as "Glasgow Corporation", until 1975. The city was part of Lanarkshire until 1893, but the functions which operated at county level were relatively few, largely being limited to lieutenancy and sheriffdom. When elected county councils were created in 1890 under the Local Government (Scotland) Act 1889, Glasgow Corporation was deemed capable of running its own affairs and so the city was excluded from the area controlled by Lanarkshire County Council, although the county council nevertheless chose to meet in Glasgow as a conveniently accessible location. In 1893, Glasgow became its own county for lieutenancy and sheriffdom purposes too, being made a county of itself.

The burgh's boundaries were extended on numerous occasions to take in places where the urban area had grown beyond the previous boundaries or where development was planned, with significant expansions including:
1830 - Blythswood
1846 - Anderston, Calton, and Gorbals
1891 - Crosshill, Govanhill, Pollokshields, Pollokshields East, Hillhead, and Maryhill
1905 - Kinning Park
1912 - Govan, Partick, and Pollokshaws
1926 - Cardonald, Crookston, Lambhill, Mansewood, Millerston, Nitshill, Scotstounhill, and Yoker
1938 - Castlemilk, Darnley, Drumchapel, and Easterhouse

City of Glasgow District Council
Local government across Scotland was reorganised in 1975 under the Local Government (Scotland) Act 1973, which replaced the counties and burghs with a two-tier structure of upper-tier regions and lower-tier districts. Glasgow became a district within the Strathclyde region. The local authority was therefore renamed the "City of Glasgow District Council". The Glasgow district covered a larger area than the pre-1975 city, gaining Baillieston, Cambuslang, Carmunnock, Carmyle, Garrowhill, Mount Vernon, Rutherglen, and Springboig.

Glasgow City Council
Local government was reorganised again in 1996 under the Local Government etc. (Scotland) Act 1994, which abolished the regions and districts created in 1975 and established 32 single-tier council areas across Scotland, one being the city of Glasgow. The council adopted its modern name of "Glasgow City Council" following these reforms. The council area created in 1996 was smaller than the district which had existed between 1975 and 1996, with the Rutherglen and Cambuslang area being transferred instead to the new South Lanarkshire council area following a local referendum.

Political control
For political control before 1975 see Politics of Glasgow

The first election to the City of Glasgow District Council was held in 1974, initially operating as a shadow authority alongside the outgoing corporation until the new system came into force on 16 May 1975. A shadow authority was again elected in 1995 ahead of the reforms which came into force on 1 April 1996. Political control of the council since 1975 has been as follows:

City of Glasgow District Council

Glasgow City Council

Leadership
For leaders before 1996 see Politics of Glasgow

The council is ceremonially headed by the Lord Provost of Glasgow, who convenes meetings of the council and performs associated tasks as a general civic leader. The role dates from the 15th century. Since 1893, when the city was made a county of itself, the Lord Provost has also acted as Lord Lieutenant of the city. The current Lord Provost, elected in May 2022 after that month's election, is Jacqueline McLaren.

Political leadership is provided by the leader of the council. The council changed from an executive-led governance system to a committee-led system in September 2017, with the leader of the council since then chairing the City Administration Committee. The leaders since 1996 have been:

Composition 
Following the 2022 election:

Elections
The council consists of 85 councillors elected for a five-year term from 23 wards. Since 2007 elections have been held every five years under the single transferable vote system, introduced by the Local Governance (Scotland) Act 2004 to replace the first-past-the-post system.

The most recent full council election took place on 5 May 2022, in which no party held a majority of the seats, as had also been the case in the preceding 2017 election. The Scottish National Party remained the largest party, winning 37 seats, whilst Labour won 36 seats, an increase relative to its 2017 result. The Greens won ten seats, also improving on their position in 2017, whilst the Conservatives lost all but two councillors.

The next election is due to take place on 6 May 2027. Election results since 1995 have been as follows:

Premises
The council has its meeting place and main offices at Glasgow City Chambers in George Square.

Glasgow Corporation was based at the Tolbooth at Glasgow Cross from at least the fifteenth century, which was rebuilt several times. The last Tolbooth on the site was built in 1626. Most of that building was demolished in 1921, leaving only the steeple standing as a clock tower.

In 1814 the corporation vacated the Tolbooth and moved to the new Justiciary Buildings on Saltmarket, overlooking Glasgow Green. The building served both as council chamber and offices for the corporation and as the courthouse for the Lower Ward of Lanarkshire. In 1844 the corporation and sheriff court moved to the new Sheriff Court on Wilson Street. The Justiciary Buildings on Saltmarket thereafter served solely as a courthouse.

In 1889 the council moved to its own purpose-built headquarters at the City Chambers in George Square.

Wards

The current multi-member ward system (23 wards, 85 seats) was introduced for the 2017 council election, replacing a similar model (21 wards, 79 seats) in place between 2007 and 2017:

Ward notes

See also
Demography of Glasgow
Politics of Scotland

Footnotes

 
Organisations based in Glasgow
Local authorities of Scotland

de:City of Glasgow